Jawahar Navodaya Vidyalaya, Baraich  (JNVBRH) is a boarding school on Lucknow Road, 10 km from Bahraich city, India. JNVBRH is funded by the Indian Ministry of Human Resources Development.

History
The school was established in the year 1987 and is a fully residential, co-educational school affiliated to CBSE, New Delhi and has classes from VI to XII standard. This Vidyalaya is run by Navodaya Vidyalaya Samiti, New Delhi, an autonomous organization under the Department of Education and Literacy, Ministry of H.R.D., Government of India.

Infrastructure
JNV Bahriach is constructed on total land area of 73 acres, in its own building with a well fenced boundary wall. School consists of 8 dormitories for boys along with 2 wardens residences and 3 dormitories for girls. The school has a large hall for general meetings and functions. s

References

Jawahar Navodaya Vidyalayas in Uttar Pradesh
Boarding schools in Uttar Pradesh
High schools and secondary schools in Uttar Pradesh
Educational institutions established in 1987
1987 establishments in Uttar Pradesh